Appointment scheduling software or meeting scheduling tools allows businesses and professionals to manage appointments and bookings. This type of software is also known as appointment booking software and online booking software.

Types of software 
Customer appointment management scheduling software falls under two categories: desktop applications and web-based systems (also known as software as a service or cloud-based systems). Note that many cloud-based software providers offer desktop and web-based appointment scheduling services.

Desktop 
Desktop applications are programs that are usually licensed and installed on end-user maintained computer hardware.  Such programs are generally very robust in terms of features and reporting, and can often be customized, but one downside is that desktop applications often do not have an online portal for staff or customer access. As well, installed applications may require ongoing maintenance, support, and upgrading by the end-user.

Web-based 
Web applications are usually provided by a third-party service provider that offers appointment scheduling tools and features as a hosted software solution, usually provided via a web browser.  One common benefit is that customers are provided the option of booking their own appointments.  This facilitates appointment scheduling over the web as customers can access their usual professionals' schedules at their convenience 24/7 and make appointments online through the Internet. This type of software does not require any update since the updates are directly implemented to the cloud.

Mobile 
Appointment scheduling mobile apps are available for smartphones. User can browse through the app to look for the most suitable service provider (keeping both quality and budget in consideration) and can request an appointment for the same. Some mobile applications use the same app for both customers and providers while some have different apps for both. Various industries have been using such apps with success.

Features
Regardless of whether the application is desktop-based or web-based, most appointment scheduling software has these primary functions:
Online availability 24/7
Integrated customer relationship management system 
Ability to monitor the booking statistics
Schedule access control
Ability to accept online payments
Automated reminders and notifications via email/SMS
 Ability to book meeting room or equipment

Different pricing models are available.  While the traditional software licensing model of a one-time licensing fee predominates for desktop applications; subscription-based, advertising-based, per-use, fee-per booking and free web-based systems are also available.

Customer appointment management software 
Customer appointment management (CAM) is a type of appointment scheduling software targeted towards companies with large mobile workforces that automatically routes and schedules in-home service appointment arrivals. The software is delivered to businesses over the Internet using the software-as-a-service model.

CAM software is powered by proprietary algorithms that learn mobile employees' work patterns to accurately predict a service technician's time of arrival and narrow a customer's wait window to 60 minutes.

CAM software applications are browser-based systems and provide scalability and flexibility, eliminate up-front, high-cap expenditures and require no dedicated IT support or ongoing maintenance. Its SaaS open architecture allows for flexible pricing models, deployment speed, and ease of use.

Dock scheduling software 
In the logistics and supply chain industry, appointment scheduling software may also be called dock scheduling software. Dock scheduling software allows organizations to manage and control the flow of shipments to and from dock doors at a plant, production facility, warehouse, distribution center, or shipping facility. Dock scheduling provides a way to manage inbound and outbound loads. Designated appointments are integral to dock scheduling, providing logistics carriers, suppliers, and vendors time slots for where and when shipments should be brought to dock doors.

See also 
Automated planning and scheduling
Digital calendar
Employee scheduling software
Project management software
Time and attendance
Time tracking software
Workforce optimization

References 

Administrative software